Nocticola gerlachi, or Gerlach's cockroach, is a species of cockroach in the family Nocticolidae. Nocticola gerlachi are found in the Seychelles, an archipelago off the African Coast. The cockroach is brown in color with "whitish" legs. The species is named after Justin Gerlach, who discovered them. Only male specimens have been collected. Females are unknown.

References 

Cockroaches
Insects of Seychelles
Endemic fauna of Seychelles
Insects described in 2003